Year 1097 (MXCVII) was a common year starting on Thursday (link will display the full calendar) of the Julian calendar.

Events 
 By place 

 First Crusade 
 Spring – The Crusaders under Godfrey of Bouillon attack the Byzantine imperial palace at Blachernae. Norman forces led by Bohemond I join the Crusaders – he is not welcome in Constantinople because his father, Robert Guiscard, has invaded Illyria (territory belonging to the Byzantine Empire), and captured the cities of Dyrrhachium and Corfu (see 1084).
 May 14 – Siege of Nicaea: The Crusaders begin their campaign with the siege of Nicaea (the capital of the Sultanate of Rum), assigning their forces to different sections of the walls, which are well-defended with 200 towers. Towards the end of May an advance party of the Seljuk Turks is defeated by troops of Raymond IV (Saint-Gilles) and Robert II. 
 June 19 – The Seljuk Turks surrender Nicaea to the Crusaders after a month siege. The Byzantines occupy the city; their commander Manuel Boutoumites is named by Emperor Alexios I (Komnenos) as doux of Nicaea. In the consternation the Crusaders are not allowed to plunder the city and are forced (again) to pledge their allegiance to Alexios.
 July 1 – Battle of Dorylaeum: The Crusaders defeat a Seljuk army led by Kilij Arslan I, ruler of the Sultanate of Rum, who wants revenge for the capture of Nicaea. During the battle many Crusaders are killed but the Seljuk Turks are forced to flee and abandon their tents and treasure after being surprised by the arrival of a second Crusader army.
 October 21 – Siege of Antioch: The Crusaders arrive outside the city and begin the siege. They can not impose a complete blockade on Antioch. The Seljuk garrison comes out of the city to harass Crusader siege-lines and intercept supply convoys (supported by a Genoese fleet of 12 galleys) from Saint Symeon and Alexandretta (modern Turkey).
 December 31 – Battle of Harenc: The Crusaders under the command of Bohemond I and Robert II defeat Seljuk forces from Aleppo, which try to relieve besieged Antioch.

 Europe 
 April/May – Battle of Gvozd Mountain: In an attempt to win the crown of the Kingdom of Croatia, the Hungarian army crosses the Drava River and invades Croatia. King Peter II of Croatia moves his residency at Knin Castle to defend his kingdom. The two armies meet each other near Gvozd Mountain (modern-day Petrova Gora). After a fierce battle Peter, the last Croatian king, is defeated and killed by the Hungarians.
 Summer – Almoravid forces launch a new campaign in Al-Andalus (modern Spain). Sultan Yusuf ibn Tashfin, leader of the Almoravid Empire, is honored with the title of Amir al Muslimin ("Commander of the Muslims").
 August 15 – Battle of Consuegra: The Castilian and Leonese army (some 30,000 men) of King Alfonso VI (the Brave) is defeated by Almoravid forces near the Castle of Consuegra. 

 Scotland
 King Donald III (the Fair) is deposed by his nephew Edgar (who is supported by King William II) after a 4-year reign. Edgar (nicknamed Probus, "the Valliant") becomes ruler of Scotland (until 1107).

 England
 William II orders the construction of Westminster Hall near Westminster Abbey in London. The hall is designed to hold banquets, ceremonies and coronations that take place in the Abbey near by.

 By topic 

 Religion 
 October – Anselm, archbishop of Canterbury, goes into exile. Conflicts between him and William II result in Anselm leaving England and heading for Rome. William confiscates Anselm's land.

Births 
 March 15 – Fujiwara no Tadamichi, Japanese nobleman (d. 1164)
 November 5 – André de Montbard, French nobleman (d. 1156)
 Abu al-Najib Suhrawardi, Persian scholar and Sufi (d. 1168)
 Abu'l-Hasan Bayhaqi, Persian polymath and official (d. 1169)
 Cecile of France, French princess and countess of Tripoli (d. 1145)
 Conrad I (the Great), margrave of Meissen (approximate date)
 Muhammad Buzurg Ummid, Persian ruler of Alamut (d. 1162)
 Zhang Jun, Chinese general and grand chancellor (d. 1164)

Deaths 
 June 6 – Agnes of Aquitaine, queen of Aragon and Navarre
 June 16 – Wen Yanbo, Chinese grand chancellor (b. 1006)
 August 15 – Diego Rodríguez, Castilian nobleman
 August 20 – Albert Azzo II, margrave of Milan and Liguria
 November 6 – Heonjong, Korean king of Goryeo (b. 1084)
 Baldwin Chauderon, French nobleman and crusader
 Florine of Burgundy, French noblewoman and crusader (b. 1083)
 Herman of Hauteville, Norman nobleman and crusader
 Marpa Lotsawa, Tibetan Buddhist teacher (b. 1012)
 Minamoto no Tsunenobu, Japanese nobleman (b. 1016)
 Muhya bint Al-Tayyani, Andalusian female poet
 Odo of Bayeux, Norman nobleman and bishop
 Peter II, king of Croatia (see Battle of Gvozd Mountain)
 Sweyn the Crusader, Danish nobleman and crusader

References